Greatest Hits is a 1988 compilation album by Kenny Rogers.

All of the tracks on the album were selected from his various recordings for RCA Nashville between 1983–87. There is one track that was not originally a single called "She's Ready for Someone to Love Her", which makes fully half of this greatest hits track list identical to the most recent 1987 album I Prefer the Moonlight.

One single that is notably missing is "Tomb of the Unknown Love" from 1985's The Heart of the Matter. The song was a #1 single in both the US and Canada. Also missing is Rogers' 1986 single "The Pride is Back" which made #30 on the US Billboard AC chart, it had not yet been released on any album.  "I Don't Call Him Daddy" was released as a single in support of this album, but with little promotion it peaked at #86 on the country chart.

Track listing

Chart performance

1988 greatest hits albums
Kenny Rogers compilation albums
RCA Records compilation albums